New York's 9th State Senate district is one of 63 districts in the New York State Senate that is currently vacant. It was most recently represented by Democrat Todd Kaminsky until July 2022. He first won in an April 2016 special election to replace Republican Majority Leader Dean Skelos, who had been expelled from the body on corruption charges.

Geography
District 9 is located almost entirely within the town of Hempstead in southwestern Nassau County on Long Island. It also includes the small city of Long Beach.

The district overlaps New York's 4th and 5th congressional districts, and with the 18th, 19th, 20th, 21st, and 22nd districts of the New York State Assembly.

Recent election results

2020

2018

2016

2016 special

2014

2012

Federal results in District 9

References

09